Japan–Peru relations are the current and historical relations between Japan and Peru. Both nations are members of the Asia-Pacific Economic Cooperation, Comprehensive and Progressive Agreement for Trans-Pacific Partnership and the Forum of East Asia–Latin America Cooperation.

History

Early relations
Early knowledge of Japan and Peru would have been through Spanish merchants who traded via the Manila Galleon from Acapulco, Mexico and Manila, Philippines as well as through Spanish missionaries. In Manila, the Spanish traded with Japanese merchants and brought their products to Spanish America (as Peru was part of the Spanish Empire at the time). In 1821, Peru declared its independence from Spain and in October 1868, Japan entered the Meiji period and began fostering diplomatic relations with several nations, after decades of isolation.

Prior to establishing formal diplomatic relations; in June 1872, Japan and Peru had a diplomatic incident when a Peruvian ship called the María Luz set sail from Macau to Callao carrying 232 Chinese indentured labourers for Peruvian plantations. On the way to Peru, the ship encountered a severe storm which caused some damage to the ship and called on the Japanese port of Yokohama for repairs. At port, one Chinese laborer managed to escape and jumped to shore. Once on shore, the laborer complained about severe mistreatment and asked for protection and the rescue of his fellow laborers on board. After a second laborer escaped from the ship, Japanese authorities boarded the ship and discovered that the Chinese nationals were being confined against their will under inhumane conditions. Many had been kidnapped, and most had no idea of the location of their final destination. The Japanese courts charged the captain, Ricardo Herrera, of the María Luz with wrongdoing and in violation of international law and set free the Chinese nationals. A year later, in 1873, Japan and Peru formally established diplomatic relations by signing a Treaty of Friendship and Navigation.

In 1899, 790 Japanese migrants, aboard the Sakuramaru arrived to Peru. Most of the migrants came to the country to work on the various plantations. By 1936, 23,000 Japanese migrants immigrated to Peru. During World War II, Peruvians sacked, looted, and burned more than 600 Japanese homes and businesses in Lima, killing 10 Japanese and injuring dozens. In January 1942, Peru broke diplomatic relations with Japan over the Attack on Pearl Harbor. Soon afterwards, Peru deported over 1,700 Japanese Peruvians to the United States where they were placed in internment camps after growing pressure from the U.S. to secure Latin America from "dangerous enemy aliens." After the war, Peru re-established diplomatic relations with Japan and in 1959, Japanese Prime Minister Nobusuke Kishi paid an official visit to Peru. In 1961, Peruvian President Manuel Prado Ugarteche became the first Peruvian and Latin-American head of state to visit Japan.

Presidency of Alberto Fujimori

In July 1990, Alberto Fujimori became the first Peruvian President of Japanese origin. Some months after President Fujimori's election, several Japanese and Peruvians of Japanese origin were assaulted, kidnapped or killed by Peru's two main guerrilla groups, the Shining Path and the Túpac Amaru Revolutionary Movement. In 1992, President Fujimori paid a visit to Japan.

On 17 December 1996, 14 members of the Túpac Amaru Revolutionary Movement stormed the Japanese Ambassador's residence in Lima as they were celebrating Japanese Emperor Akihito's 63rd birthday, and took hostage more than 400 diplomatic, governmental and military officials. The insurgents believed that President Fujimori would be in attendance at the party. When they discovered that he was not present, they demanded from the Peruvian government the release of 300 jailed comrades. The incident became known as the Japanese embassy hostage crisis and lasted until 22 April 1997 when Peruvian commandos entered the residence and killed all 14 insurgents. During the siege, supreme court judge Carlos Giusti died in the operation and two soldiers were killed. Japanese Prime Minister, Ryutaro Hashimoto, thanked Peru for the release of the hostages

In November 2000, President Fujimori flew to Brunei to attend the 12th APEC summit. After the summit, he flew to Japan and faxed his resignation of the Presidency as a corruption scandal was collapsing his government. In Japan, Fujimori requested and was granted Japanese citizenship based on his origins. The Peruvian government, under President Alejandro Toledo requested Japan to extradite Fujimori to face 20 criminal charges, however, Japan refused to extradite one of its citizens, which harmed relations between both nations. In 2006, Fujimori left Japan and flew to Mexico and Chile where he was arrested. He was trying to return to Peru to run for President.

Post Fujimori
In the 1990s Japan changed their immigration law and allowed the return of "Dekasegi" (people of Japanese origin born abroad) to return to Japan and receive permanent residency. Approximately 60,000 Peruvians of Japanese descent left the country for Japan, making them the second largest Latin American community in Japan (after Brazil). In 2013, Japan and Peru celebrated 140 years of diplomatic relations.

High-level visits

High-level visit from Japan to Peru
 Prince Mikasa (1958)
 Prime Minister Nobusuke Kishi (1959)
 Crown Prince Akihito (1963, 1967)
 Prime Minister Zenkō Suzuki (1982)
 Prime Minister Ryutaro Hashimoto (1996, 1997)
 Prime Minister Tarō Asō (2008)
 Prince Hitachi (2009)
 Prince Aksihino (2014)
 Prime Minister Shinzō Abe (2016)

High-level visits from Peru to Japan
 President Manuel Prado Ugarteche (1961)
 President Alberto Fujimori (1992, 1995)
 President Alan García (2008, 2009, 2010)
 President Ollanta Humala (2012)

Bilateral relations
Japan and Peru have signed several bilateral agreements/treaties such as a Trade and Financial Agreement (1949); Agreement on the elimination of visas (1971); Technical Cooperation Agreement (1979); Cooperation Agreement on Agriculture Development (1987); Agreement on the Promotion and Protection of Investments (2008); and an Agreement on Japanese donations on the protection of Peruvian Archeological sites (2016).

Trade
In 2013, trade between Japan and Peru totaled US$3.5 billion. Japan's main exports to Peru include: automobile, auto parts, tires and steel. Peru's main exports to Japan include: copper, fish meal, silver and zinc. That same year, Japanese direct investment in Peru totaled US$238 million. Several well known multinational Japanese companies such as Honda, Sony, Toshiba and Toyota (among others) operate in Peru. In 2010, Japana and Peru signed an Economic Partnership Agreement. Both nations were party to the Trans-Pacific Partnership.

Resident diplomatic missions
 Japan has an embassy in Lima.
 Peru has an embassy in Tokyo, and consulates-general in Tokyo and Nagoya.

See also
 Japanese embassy hostage crisis
 Japanese Peruvians
 María Luz Incident
 Peruvian migration to Japan
 List of ambassadors of Peru to Japan
 List of ambassadors of Japan to Peru

References 

 
Peru
Japan